Irene Cruz-González Espinosa (born 1953) is a Mexican astronomer whose research interests include the nuclear activity in galaxies, the observation of galaxies and their insterstellar medium, star formation, and optical and infrared telescope instrumentation. She is a researcher and professor in the Institute of Astronomy at the National Autonomous University of Mexico (UNAM).

Education and career
Irene Cruz-González was born in 1953, in Mexico City,. She is the daughter of two artists, her father Carlos Cruz-González Aliphat was a landscape designer and her mother Rebeca Espinosa was an artist. Her brother Carlos Cruz-González was also an astronomer who died early in his research career. She is married to the mathematician Javier Bracho and has two sons Felipe and Adrian Bracho Cruz-González. She studied physics as an undergraduate at UNAM and worked on a BSc dissertation in astronomy supervised by Silvia Torres-Peimbert. Afterwards Irene Cruz-González went to Harvard University for graduate study in astronomy, earning a master's degree in 1979 under the supervision of Giovanni Fazio and a Ph.D. in 1984. Her doctoral dissertation, Continuum distributions of active galactic nuclei, was supervised by John P. Huchra.

She returned to Mexico and joined the UNAM Institute of Astronomy as a researcher in 1984.

Book
With Abraham Nosnik and Elsa Recillas, Irene Cruz-González is a coauthor of a book on Galileo, El hombre de la torre inclinada: Galileo Galilei (1st ed., Gatopardo, 1985; edited also in Chile and Colombia).

Recognition
Irene Cruz-González is a member of the Mexican Academy of Sciences. From 2010 to 2018 she was part of UNAM´s government board (Junta de Gobierno). UNAM gave her their National University Prize in 2002, and the Sor Juana Ines de la Cruz prize in 2006.

References

External links
Interview with Cruz-González on light pollution, UDGTV

1953 births
Living people
Mexican astronomers
Women astronomers
National Autonomous University of Mexico alumni
Harvard University alumni
Academic staff of the National Autonomous University of Mexico
Members of the Mexican Academy of Sciences